Oslimg Roberto Mora Pasache (born 2 June 1999) is a Peruvian footballer who plays as a right winger for Peruvian Primera División side Atlético Grau.

Club career

Alianza Lima
Mora is a product of Alianza Lima. In 2016, he was named the best player of the year by the Peruvian newspaper La Nueve. Mora was promoted to Alianza's first team for the 2018 season but however, he continued to play with the club's reserve team.

He was loaned out to Universidad San Martín for the 2019 season, where he made his break through in Peruvian football, playing 29 games, scoring one goal and three assist on the right winger position.

After returning for the 2020 season following a successful loan spell at San Martín, he signed a new 3-year deal with Alianza. He got his official debut on 1 February 2020 in the first game of the year against Alianza Universidad as a starter. Mora also played the following four games from start and also became the player with most dribble attempts in the 2020 Copa Libertadores.

At the end of April 2020 Mora revealed, that he years ago was forced to reject a trial at Real Madrid because his family couldn't afford to pay for the visa.

Atlético Grau
On 8 December 2022 Atlético Grau confirmed, that Mora had joined the club, signing a deal until the end of 2023.

International career
In 2017, Mora was a part of the Peruvian U18 national team. In November 2018 he made his debut for the Peruvian U20 national team in a friendly game against Ecuador. He was later called up for the 2019 South American U-20 Championship where he played in all four group games.

He made his debut for the Peru national football team on 10 October 2021 in a World Cup qualifier against Bolivia.

References

External links
 
 
 

Living people
1999 births
Association football defenders
Association football wingers
Peruvian footballers
Peru under-20 international footballers
Peru international footballers
People from Pisco, Peru
Peruvian Primera División players
Club Alianza Lima footballers
Club Deportivo Universidad de San Martín de Porres players
Atlético Grau footballers